Erik Johannessen may refer to:

 Erik Johannessen (musician) (born 1975), Norwegian musician and composer
 Erik Johannessen (footballer, born 1952), Norwegian former footballer
 Erik Johannessen (footballer, born 1984), Swedish footballer
 Erik Harry Johannessen (1902–1980), Norwegian painter